is a railway station in the city of Agano, Niigata, Japan, operated by East Japan Railway Company (JR East).

Lines
Kamiyama Station is served by the Uetsu Main Line, and is 13.9 kilometers from the terminus of the line at Niitsu Station.

Station layout

The station consists of one ground-level side platform serving a single bi-directional track. The station is unattended.

History
Kamiyama Station opened on 28 September 1944 as a signal stop. It was elevated to a full station on 20 January 1955. With the privatization of Japanese National Railways (JNR) on 1 April 1987, the station came under the control of JR East.

Surrounding area
The station is located in a rural area, surrounded by rice fields. There are few buildings nearby.

See also
 List of railway stations in Japan

External links
 JR East station information 

Railway stations in Niigata Prefecture
Uetsu Main Line
Railway stations in Japan opened in 1955
Agano, Niigata